Defending champion Roger Federer defeated Lleyton Hewitt in the final, 6–3, 6–2 to win the singles tennis title at the 2004 Tennis Masters Cup. It was his second Tour Finals title.

Seeds

Alternate

Draw

Finals

Red group
Standings are determined by: 1. number of wins; 2. number of matches; 3. in two-players-ties, head-to-head records; 4. in three-players-ties, percentage of sets won, or of games won; 5. steering-committee decision.

Blue group
Standings are determined by: 1. number of wins; 2. number of matches; 3. in two-players-ties, head-to-head records; 4. in three-players-ties, percentage of sets won, or of games won; 5. steering-committee decision.

See also
ATP World Tour Finals appearances

External links
Finals Draw
Round robin Draw (Red Group)
Round robin Draw (Blue Group)

Singles
2004 ATP Tour